The Texas Mexican Railway  was a railroad that operated as a subsidiary of the Kansas City Southern Railway in Texas.  It is often referred to as the Tex-Mex, or TexMex Railway.

On January 1, 2005, Kansas City Southern took control of the Texas Mexican Railway and the U.S. portion of the Texas Mexican Railway International Bridge in Laredo, Texas. The railroad is a vital link in KCS's rail network, connecting KCS and TFM (aka KCS de Mexico). While Tex-Mex remains a separate legal entity, KCS and Tex-Mex are operated as one railroad.

History

19th century

Chartered in March 1875, the Corpus Christi, San Diego and Rio Grande Gauge Railroad built a  narrow-gauge line from Corpus Christi, Texas to Rancho Banquete, Texas between 1875 and 1877, and then on to San Diego, Texas by 1879.  This  line's main purpose was to take domestic sheep from Texas ranches to the shores of the Gulf of Mexico, and received some funding from Richard King and Mifflin Kenedy.  In 1881, the line was sold to a syndicate that included William J. Palmer and it was given a new charter as the Texas Mexican Railway.  Under this document, the line was built an additional  to Laredo, Texas.  While the charter also allowed for other lines which would have made a  network, including one line from San Diego to the Sabine River with branch lines to Tyler, Galveston, San Antonio, Texas, and Sabine Pass, these expansions were never constructed.  The small Galveston, Brazos and Colorado Railroad was purchased in 1881 for a connection to Galveston, but a line was never built between the two railroads.

In 1883 a bridge was built across the Rio Grande to Nuevo Laredo, making the Tex-Mex the first Mexico–United States rail connection.  This granted rail access for all of Northern Mexico to the Port of Corpus Christi, devastating international commerce in Brownsville in the lower Rio Grande Valley, and its deep water port, Los Brazos de Santiago.  This rail connection also devastated the commercial navigation of the Rio Grande, between Rio Grande City, Camargo (Mexico), Brownsville, and Los Brazos de Santiago, located adjacent to the mouth of the Rio Grande.

It was not until 1889 that the North American rail system connected Mexico with Canada. In 1910 an international rail bridge was completed in Brownsville, Texas and Matamoros, Tamaulipas, which is currently owned and operated by the Brownsville and Matamoros Bridge Company and operates as the Brownsville & Matamoros International Bridge, a joint venture of the Union Pacific and the Mexican government.

20th century
The Mexican government controlled the Tex-Mex from 1900 to 1982, when privatization made it part of Grupo TFM.  The railway became  on July 17, 1902. In 1906 it bought the Texas Mexican Northern Railway, and in 1930, the San Diego and Gulf Railway.

Ordered on April 22, 1938, seven Whitcomb Locomotive Works diesel locomotives were delivered between August and November of 1939.  While some steam locomotives were kept until 1946 or 1947, they were almost never used, and the Tex-Mex is considered to be the first railway in the world to dieselize.

They also began operating a  government railroad from Corpus Christi to a naval air station in 1940.  In 1995, the expanding KCS bought 49 percent of Tex-Mex, and in 1997, the Surface Transportation Board granted trackage rights to the Tex-Mex to connect to the KCS at Beaumont, Texas.  Responding to increased international trade between the US and Mexico, the railroad built a large railroad yard and intermodal freight transport facility at Laredo in 1998. They also won Regional Railroad of the Year that same year.

21st century
In 2002, however, both companies sold their shares to Grupo Transportación Ferroviaria Mexicana.  In August 2004, KCS again purchased a controlling interest in Tex-Mex, although they were held by a trust company until the Surface Transportation Board approved the move for January 2005.

In 1996 Tex-Mex bought a 90 miles segment of unused/abandoned Southern Pacific trackage from Rosenberg to Victoria, TX. The line was dormant and unused by the TM until 2006 when they announced they would rebuild the line to avoid continued running on a circuitous Union Pacific route from Houston via Flatonia to Victoria. In June 2009, Tex-Mex began operating on new trackage between Victoria and Rosenberg, Texas, known as the Macaroni Line. The line was built in 1882 and was called the Macaroni Line because the main food for the workers constructing the line was macaroni. In 1885, it was acquired by Southern Pacific, which operated the 91-mile line until 1985: by the early 1990s, the tracks were mostly worn out. In 2006, KCS and Tex-Mex announced they would rebuild the Macaroni Line, to end the need for trackage rights on a circuitous Union Pacific route. Construction began in January 2009 and the line opened for the first trains for over 20 years, by June 2009. The line now operates daily trains and has CTC signaling.

On May 23, 2018, the Tex-Mex announced they were moving the point of interchange where the railroad met Kansas City Southern de Mexico (KCSM).  For many years the interchange took place on the bridge connecting Mexico and the United States at Laredo, Texas where Mexican crews and American crews would change out.  American crews working for Tex-Mex did not operate in Mexico and Mexican crews working for KCSM did not operate in the U.S.  The Federal Railroad Administration (FRA) approved the Tex-Mex's request to allow Mexican crews to cross the border with their trains and operate 9 miles into the U.S. to the North Laredo switching yard.  The Carrier asserted that this would relieve the congestion and road blockages by the long freight trains, which lasted for hours in Neuvo Laredo and in Laredo since the trains would no longer have to change crews on the border bridge.  The Brotherhood of Locomotive Engineers & Trainmen (BLET) objected to the use of Mexican crews in the United States and threatened to strike over the matter. U.S. District Court Judge Diana Saldana enjoined the BLET from striking and ordered the parties to arbitrate the matter before an arbitrator. The arbitrator ruled on July 19, 2020 that the bargaining contracts between the Tex-Mex Railway and the BLET allowed the railroad the exclusive right to determine where the point of interchange would be. He noted that the FRA's decision to allow Mexican crews to operate into the United States was not before him, because that matter had previously been decided by the FRA and was not a part of the BLET's grievance.

References

Former Class I railroads in the United States
Texas railroads
Predecessors of the Kansas City Southern Railway
Railway companies established in 1881
Narrow gauge railroads in Texas
Transportation in Duval County, Texas
Transportation in Jim Hogg County, Texas
Transportation in Jim Wells County, Texas
Transportation in Nueces County, Texas
Transportation in Webb County, Texas
3 ft gauge railways in the United States
1881 establishments in Texas
Porfiriato